Adenoon is a genus of flowering plants in the daisy family described in 1850.

There is only one known species, Adenoon indicum, native to the Western Ghats (Maharashtra, Goa, Karnataka, Tamil Nadu and Kerala) of southwestern India.

References

Monotypic Asteraceae genera
Endemic flora of India (region)
Plants described in 1850
Flora of Goa
Flora of Karnataka
Flora of Tamil Nadu
Flora of Kerala
Flora of Maharashtra
Taxa named by Nicol Alexander Dalzell